Alexis Gouletquer (born 13 July 1999) is a French professional footballer who plays as a forward for French Championnat National 2 club C'Chartres.

Professional career
On 16 January 2020, Gouletquer signed his first professional contract with Le Mans FC. Gouletquer made his professional debut with Le Mans in a 0-0 Ligue 2 tie with Rodez AF on 14 February 2020.

On 24 June 2022, Gouletquer signed with C'Chartres in the fourth-tier Championnat National 2.

References

External links
 

1999 births
Living people
Footballers from Lille
Association football forwards
French footballers
Le Mans FC players
C'Chartres Football players
Ligue 2 players
Championnat National players
Championnat National 3 players